The government led by Prime Minister Abdolhossein Hazhir was formed on 15 June 1948 and replaced the cabinet of Ebrahim Hakimi. It is one of the short-lived cabinets in the Pahlavi Iran and was dissolved on 6 November 1948 when the Prime Minister Hazhir resigned from office. Mohammad Sa'ed formed the next cabinet.

Background
Premiership of Abdolhossein Hazhir was approved by 66 deputies out of 120 Parliament members on 13 June 1948. It was protested by religious figures, including Abol-Ghasem Kashani. Despite these protests the cabinet received a vote of confidence from the Parliament on 29 June 1948. Due to the ongoing protests Hazhir demanded a second parliamentarian vote of confidence which was granted on 23 August. However, the cabinet had to resign on 6 November because of the continuous mass protests.

List of ministers
On 15 June 1948 when the cabinet was announced, it was reported that appointments to the ministry of roads and to the ministry of agriculture would be declared later. The members of the cabinet were as follows:

References

1948 establishments in Iran
1948 disestablishments in Iran
Cabinets of Iran
Cabinets established in 1948
Cabinets disestablished in 1948